J.J. College of Arts and Science, is a general degree college located in Pudukkottai, Tamil Nadu. The college is affiliated with Bharathidasan University. This college offers different courses in arts, commerce and science. College rank is 99.

Accreditation
The college is  recognized by the University Grants Commission (UGC).

References

External links
 http://jjc.kvet.in/

Colleges affiliated to Bharathidasan University
Universities and colleges in Tiruchirappalli